Roar! TV is a television network that launched in early 2012 dedicated to empowering women's television programming.

The Network's programming includes a mix of fitness, lifestyle, comedy, mini-series and even films.  Roar! TV also recently launched a Spanish-language programming block mainly featuring telenovelas.

Roar! TV is broadcast on cable television and over-the-air nationwide in the US and has announced it is launching on October 1, 2012, on Dish Network replacing WE tv after the dispute between AMC networks and Dish Network respectively.

Roar! TV is a digital sub-channel in many major and smaller markets around the country and is most commonly a sub-channel on NBC affiliate stations.

Roar! TV is the largest women-staffed television network in cable television, with over 80% of its employees being female.   The Network is based in Chicago, not far from Harpo Studios, where Oprah Winfrey's talk show was filmed. Roar! TV is now the biggest competitor to Oprah's OWN TV as well as the more established Lifetime Network.  Starting with less distribution then the former, Roar! TV is the fastest growing women's television network in America.

External links
http://www.roar-TV.com

Television stations in the United States